Ain't No Doubt About It may refer to:

Ain't No Doubt About It, an album by DJ Magic Mike and MC Madness, 1991

Songs
"Ain't No Doubt About It", composed by Jimmy George and Stephanie Spruill
"Ain't No Doubt About It", by C.A. Quintet
"Ain't No Doubt About It", by The Emotions from Sunbeam
"Ain't No Doubt About It", by Eric Darius from Goin' All Out
"Ain't No Doubt About It", by Game, an outtake from The R.E.D. Album
"Ain't No Doubt About It", by Mavis Staples from If All I Was Was Black
"Ain't No Doubt About It", by The Sylvers from Something Special
"Ain't No Doubt About It", by Wilson Pickett from Wilson Pickett in Philadelphia
"Eyes For You (Ain't No Doubt About It)", by Daryl Hall from Laughing Down Crying

See also
No Doubt About It (disambiguation)